This list of Afrikaans language poets includes poets who write, or wrote, in the Afrikaans language.

A
 Hennie Aucamp

B
 Peter Blum
 Breyten Breytenbach

C
 Jan F. E. Celliers
 T.T. Cloete
 Sheila Cussons

D
 Johann de Lange
 I. D. du Plessis
 Phil du Plessis

E
 Elisabeth Eybers

H
 Joan Hambidge
 Daniel Hugo

J
 Ingrid Jonker

K
 Olga Kirsch
 Koos Kombuis
 Uys Krige
 Antjie Krog

L
 C. J. Langenhoven
 C. Louis Leipoldt
 N. P. van Wyk Louw
 W.E.G. Louw

M
 Lucas Malan
 D. F. Malherbe
 Eugene Marais
 Mikro (pseudonym for Christoffel Hermanus Kühn)

N
 Gert Vlok Nel

O
 D. J. Opperman

P
 Mathews Phosa

S
 Adam Small
 Lina Spies

T
 Totius

V
 C. M. van den Heever
 Ernst van Heerden
 N. P. van Wyk Louw

W
 George Weideman

See also
 Afrikaans literature
 List of Afrikaans singers

Afrikaans language
 
 
Afrikaans
Poets, Afrikaans language poets